The McRoskey Mattress Company is a handmade mattress making firm founded in San Francisco, CA. Established by two brothers in October 1899, it has been trading continuously ever since, including during the aftermath of the San Francisco earthquake of 1906. The company operates out of their "flagship showroom" at 1687 Market St. in San Francisco.

History 

The company was founded by Edward and Leonard McRoskey at the intersection of Harrison and 16th Street.  Originally they had arrived in San Francisco as salesmen for a Chicago based engineering firm hoping to sell mattress making equipment to other manufacturers.  Instead the McRoskeys decided to set up business for themselves as manufacturers of handmade mattresses.

Only seven years later the city was hit by the earthquake and fire that followed, the company was the only manufacturer of mattresses to survive and as such its products were in much demand by the inhabitants.

In the 1920s the two brothers became competitors: Leonard continued to operate McRoskey & Co. while Edward opened his store at 1506 Market Street under the name of Edward L. McRoskey Mattress Company. In 1925, Edward built a new factory and showroom at 1687 Market Street where the company continues to retail today. He was very forward-thinking with the building's construction and design, it was built out of reinforced concrete to help it withstand future earthquakes. In 1929, Edward's brother Leonard died and his business was closed.

On May 1, 1931, Edward L. McRoskey filed for his first patent for the McRoskey Tufting Machine, designed to help make the tufts stronger and requiring less needle work from the mattress makers. He later refined the process and invented a button threading machine that added buttons to mattress tufts. Additionally, he improved tufting even further by inventing a hand tool to be used for tufting, eliminating the need for a long upholstery needle and increasing the resiliency and springiness of the premium mattresses.

Robin McRoskey Azevedo, CEO and third-generation owner of the McRoskey San Francisco.

Ownership 
Shortly after the move to Market and Gough, the second generation of McRoskey's, Edward's sons, Leonard and Robert, joined the firm. It is Robert's daughter (and therefore the granddaughter of one of the founders), Robin who heads the firm today.

References

External links
 Cento: A Market Street Journal (1996, Susan Schwartzenberg, SF Art Commission - booklet with article on McRoskey)
 Environmental Impact Of Mattresses

Manufacturing companies based in San Francisco
Manufacturing companies established in 1899
1899 establishments in California